Rahul Kanwal is an Indian TV journalist and News Director at India Today. He was born on 14 September 1980 in Deolali, Maharashtra. He is the host of the prime-time show Newstrack on weekdays and interview based show, Jab We Met, on India Today TV.

Career
Kanwal went to St. Joseph's College, Allahabad. He studied Journalism at Delhi University, he's a Chevening scholar and has done a programme in International Broadcast Journalism from Cardiff University. He also won a Rory Peck Trust grant for a course in Hostile Environment Journalism. He started his career in 1999 as an anchor-cum-reporter with Zee News and later joined Aaj Tak in 2002. He has also served as the Editor-at-Large in Aaj Tak and India Today in TV Today Group.

In 2019, Kanwal interviewed India's union minister Piyush Goyal, where he questioned the minister over the Balakot strikes. He was criticized for simulating a skirmish between CRPF and Naxal insurgents in his TV show.

Awards 
In 2013, Kanwal was awarded the best anchor at the Indian Television Academy Awards

Kanwal was awarded the National annual award as part of the Maharana of Mewar Charitable Foundation in 2016.

In 2019, he was awarded in the Best Anchor category at the Exchange4media News Broadcasting Awards.

References

External links
 

1980 births
Living people
Journalists from Maharashtra
India Today people
Indian male television journalists